Roberta Smith (born 1948) is co-chief art critic of The New York Times and a lecturer on contemporary art. She is the first woman to hold that position.

Early life
Born in 1948 in New York City and raised in Lawrence, Kansas. Smith studied at Grinnell College in Iowa. Her career in the arts started in 1968, while an undergraduate summer intern at the Corcoran Gallery of Art in Washington D.C.

Career
In 1968-1969 she participated in the Art History/Museum Studies track of the Whitney Independent Study Program (ISP) where she met and developed an affinity for Donald Judd and became interested in minimal art. After graduation, she returned to New York City in 1971 to take a secretarial job at the Museum of Modern Art, followed by part-time assistant jobs to Judd in the early 1970s, and Paula Cooper for the first three years that she had her Paula Cooper Gallery, beginning in 1972.

While at the Paula Cooper Gallery Smith wrote exhibition reviews for Artforum, and subsequently for Art in America, the Village Voice and other publications. She has written and spoken about Judd on many occasions throughout her career, and upon his death in 1995, penned his New York Times obituary.

Smith began writing for The New York Times in 1986, and became the newspaper's co-chief art critic in 2011. She has written many essays for catalogues and monographs on contemporary artists, and wrote the featured essay in the 1975 Judd catalogue raisonné published by the National Gallery of Canada. She writes not only about contemporary art but about the visual arts in general, including decorative arts, popular and outsider art, design and architecture.

Smith is a longtime advocate for museums to be free and open to the public. In 2012, she received an honorary Doctorate of Fine Arts from the San Francisco Art Institute. In 2017, the School of the Art Institute of Chicago awarded Smith her second honorary doctorate.

Personal life
Smith married Jerry Saltz, senior art critic for New York magazine, in 1992. The couple lives in an apartment in Greenwich Village.

Awards
 2003 Frank Jewett Mather Award for Art Criticism, College Art Association.
 2009 AICA/USA Distinguished Critic Lecture.
 2014 Marina Kellen French Distinguished Visitor, The American Academy in Berlin.

See also
 Bob and Roberta Smith, British artist

References

External links
Articles in The New York Times, accessed May 18, 2009
Interview in the Brooklyn Rail, accessed May 18, 2009

1947 births
American art critics
American women journalists
Critics employed by The New York Times
Frank Jewett Mather Award winners
Grinnell College alumni
Living people
American women critics
Writers from New York (state)
21st-century American women